WPSP (1190 AM) is a radio station broadcasting a Spanish Contemporary format. Licensed to Royal Palm Beach, Florida, United States, the station serves the West Palm Beach area. The station is currently owned by George M. Arroyo.

History
The station went on the air as WOEZ on 1989-09-01. On 1995-03-10, the station changed its call sign to WLAZ, and on 1995-12-08, to the current WPSP,

References

External links

PSP
Radio stations established in 1989
1989 establishments in Florida